MS World Discoverer was a cruise ship designed for and built by Schichau Unterweser, Germany in 1974. During construction called BEWA Discoverer, the ship was completed in Bremerhaven, Germany. In 2000, the ship struck an underwater obstacle and was damaged; it was subsequently grounded – to prevent sinking – and abandoned in the Solomon Islands.

History
The vessel was originally built as the BEWA Discoverer in 1974. The ship was sold to BEWA Cruises out of Denmark. In July 1976, the vessel was sold to Adventure Cruises, Inc. and was renamed World Discoverer. The ship also became a long-term charter to Society Expeditions. In 1976, the ship was registered in Singapore. In 1987, Society Expedition came under new ownership and was renamed Society Expedition Cruises, with offices in Seattle, United States and Germany. In 1990, she was registered in Liberia under the name World Discoverer. The vessel had a double hull construction, allowing for periodic voyages to the Antarctic polar regions to allow its passengers to observe ice floe movements and providing protection for minor impacts. In 1996, the ship was refurbished under the new name, World Discoverer. The ship carried a fleet of inflatable dinghies, allowing passengers to move closer to ice floes for observation.

Service history

During the period from November through February (Austral summer), the ship conducted cruises in the Southern Hemisphere and visited places like Antarctica, the Falkland Islands, Chile and Argentina. From March to May and August to October, the ship cruised the South Pacific Islands. Between the months of June and August, the ship cruised around the Alaskan region and also the Russian border around the Bering Sea. World Discoverer was classified as a Swedish/Finnish 1A Ice Class, allowing the ship to withstand minor floe impacts.  The World Discoverer also had a  cruising range, allowing the ship to travel the Northwest Passage.

The ship was captained by Oliver Kruess, who had previously crewed as chief mate. Society Expeditions also hired a small team of experienced expedition leaders to answer tourist questions concerning the region, ice floes, their movements, and the ship's destinations. A small fleet of dinghies landed passengers on various shorelines for observation of local wildlife in the area. Each day comprised typically two to three shore expeditions, led by geologists, historians, naturalists, and marine biologists. The ship was equipped with an observation lounge, medical center with an active physician, library, sun deck with a small swimming pool, small fitness center, and a lecture hall.

Wreck 
On 30 April 2000, at 4 p.m. local time (0500 GMT), the ship struck a large uncharted rock or reef in the Sandfly Passage, Solomon Islands. Captain Kruess sent a distress signal, which was received in Honiara, the Solomon Islands' capital city. A passenger ferry was dispatched to the ship and all passengers were then transported to safety. The captain then brought the ship into Roderick Bay after the ship began to list 20 degrees and grounded it to avoid sinking. After underwater surveying of the ship, World Discoverer was declared a constructive total loss. The ship has remained in Roderick Bay ever since. 

Michael Lomax, president of Society Expeditions, congratulated the captain and crew for their heroic and professional actions, saying that they performed in an "exemplary manner" during the crisis. The ship was scheduled to have its annual dry-dock inspection on 11 May when annual maintenance work would have been completed. Also planned were two additional suites on the boat deck and the installation of a new fire protection system throughout the ship.

Aftermath
World Discoverer still sits in Roderick Bay of the Nggela Islands with a 46° list. The closest salvage companies, stationed in Australia, found the ship ransacked by locals and other factions. The Solomon Islands were undergoing civil war at the time. Tidal activity damaged the ship even more. The ship has been sustaining surface rusting with many of the windows removed. The ship became a tourist attraction with the locals of the island as well as other cruise lines that pass by World Discoverer, including MV Princess II. A salvage was attempted in 2000 but "abandoned after shots were exchanged with the local tribe."

In the aftermath of the wreck, Society Expedition refurbished an ice-class vessel and called it World Discoverer. It launched in 2002, resuming cruises. Society Expedition ceased operations in June 2004 after their new vessel was seized by creditors in Nome, Alaska. Two weeks later, it filed for chapter 7 liquidation bankruptcy. After further name changes, the later ship now operates as Silver Explorer.

References

External links 

 "Abandoned Cruise Ship: The World Discoverer." Sometimes Interesting. 11 August 2011
 Restplace

Cruise ships
Maritime incidents in 2000
Ships built in Bremen (state)
1973 ships